Ivor Ernst Slaney (born 27 May 1921 in West Bromwich, United Kingdom, d. 20 March 1998, Southampton, United Kingdom) was a prolific musical composer and conductor, notable for his work in film, television and radio.

Slaney was educated at the Royal College of Music, and married Mary D Ludlow pianist Dolores Ventura in 1948. He divorced in 1969 and remarried in 1974.  His father, Ernst Wallace Slaney, was the principal 'cellist in the Bournemouth Municipal Orchestra in the 1920s and 1930s under Sir Dan Godfrey. As a youngster Ivor joined the choir of St Stephen's Church, Bournemouth where he was also taught by Percy Whitlock, the church's Director of Music and a colleague of Ernst Slaney at the Bournemouth Pavilion. According to Whitlock's diary, Ivor was known as 'Tiny'. Ivor's mother was Grace Elizabeth Arney (b 22 April 1893, died July 1988). She married Ernst in Bristol in 1920.

In 1935, aged 14, Ivor entered the Royal Artillery in Woolwich and gained a scholarship to the Royal College of Music. Following this, he joined up as a musician in the Royal Army Ordnance Corps.

Ivor Slaney's son, Adrian E Slaney, was born in 1950. His daughter was born in 1979.  In later life Ivor Slaney lived in Milford on Sea, Hampshire.

His best-known works include "Top Dog", which was used as the theme music for the BBC radio comedy series The Men from the Ministry and  Carlos' Theme (from The Sentimental Agent) for which he won an Ivor Novello award.
Ivor Slaney also composed hundreds of mood music pieces, fanfares and "stings". Many examples are available on the DeWolfe site (see below). He also wrote the music for several Hammer Films, including 36 Hours (1953), The Gambler and the Lady (1953), Spaceways (1953), and The House Across the Lake (1954), as well as the scores to The Strange Case of the End of Civilization as We Know It (1977), Prey (1977), Terror (1978), and Death Ship (1980). Slaney was also composer and musical director for the British Children's Film Foundation cinema movie series The Magnificent Six and 1/2 from 1968–69, as well as the TV series Here Come the Double Deckers (1970–71) which followed it. He also composed the theme to the "Harry Worth" TV show which showed the famous "window routine".

External links
Biography of Slaney by David Noades
Ivor Slaney music (full excerpts) at www.dewolfe.co.uk

References

1921 births
1998 deaths
Alumni of the Royal College of Music
20th-century classical musicians
20th-century English composers